Matthew James Humphreys (born 28 September 2002) is an Irish cricketer. He plays for the Northern Knights in Irish domestic cricket.

Career 
A product of Lisburn Cricket Club, Humphreys played age-level cricket in Northern Ireland, captaining a Belfast under-14 side in 2017. 

Having played a pivotal part in helping the Ireland Under-19 team to qualify for the 2022 ICC Under-19 Cricket World Cup in the West Indies, he was subsequently named in the Ireland under-19 squad for the World Cup, where he played in six matches during the tournament and took 11 wickets. 

He was named by Cricket Ireland in the core Northern Knights squad for the 2022 season. He made his debut for the Northern Knights in a List A one-day match against the Munster Reds at Belfast in the 2022 Inter-Provincial Cup, where he took the wickets of Ireland internationals Kevin O'Brien and David Delany. 

Later in the season he made his Twenty20 debut against the North West Warriors in the 2022 Inter-Provincial Trophy festival at Comber. 

He was retained by the Knights for the 2023 season.

Despite having not played first-class cricket, Humphreys was named in Ireland's Test squad for their tours of Bangladesh in March 2023 and Sri Lanka in April 2023. He was also named in the T20I and ODI squads for the tours. He was awarded a casual contract by Cricket Ireland in March 2023. He made his ODI debut against Bangladesh, on 20 March 2023.

References

External links
 

2002 births
Living people
Cricketers from Belfast
Irish cricketers
Northern Knights cricketers